Rauf Hukmatov (born 2 March 1978) is a Tajikistani judoka.

He finished in joint fifth place in the half-middleweight (81 kg) division at the 2006 Asian Games, having lost to Guo Lei of China in the bronze medal match.

He currently resides in Dushanbe.

External links
2006 Asian Games profile

1978 births
Living people
Tajikistani male judoka
Judoka at the 2006 Asian Games
Asian Games competitors for Tajikistan
Place of birth missing (living people)